The Victorian Vikings are a field hockey team which participate in Australia's national field hockey league, the AHL. The team is mostly made up of  amateurs who participate in the Victorian State League Division 1. Previous to being known as the Victorian Vikings, the Victorian team have been referred to Melbourne Redbacks, VIS Redbacks and Azuma Vikings. The team's home stadium is the Victorian State Netball and Hockey Centre.

Championships
Since their inception in the inaugural 1991 season, the Vikings have won 2 championships; the fourth most of any club in the league. These two championships came in the 1996 and 1998 competitions. They came second in 1991 season and have finished in 3rd place on numerous occasions.

2009 squad

Notable players

Stadium
The team's home ground is the State Netball and Hockey Centre. which is located within a kilometre of the Melbourne CBD. The stadium has a capacity of about 4,500 with 1000 seats however capacity is expanded through temporary seating for big tournaments. The stadium was used for the 2006 Commonwealth games and will host the 2009 Champions league.

Women's team
Since the women's competition was included into the AHL in 1993, the Victorian Vipers have experienced varying levels of success. The solitary championship was won in 2003. Notable women in the team which have represented the Hockeyroos include Louise Dobson and Rachel Imison.

References

Australian field hockey clubs
Representative sports teams of Victoria (Australia)
Field hockey clubs established in 1991
1991 establishments in Australia
Sport in the City of Melbourne (LGA)